

Films

References

Films
2014
2014-related lists